Mheibes is a traditional game involving two teams. It is mostly played in the Arab Mashriq, and specifically in Iraq and it is roughly equivalent to the English game Up Jenkins .

The word Mheibes is a cognate of the word Mihbes, which means ring. The game involves two teams, with each team attempting to hide a ring from the other. The game begins with a player going around the team, to give the ring to one person, trying to prevent the other team from knowing which player holds the ring.

The other team must then nominate a player, who has only one guess to find out who is holding the ring. The decision is based on studying the facial expressions of each team member. The player can also rule out players if he believes they do not hold the ring. He can rule out as many as he wants.

When a player rules out a hand holding the ring, the ring is exposed followed by a shouting of the word Bat implying in the iraqi-dialect "to sleep over" or to "stay the night", as the ring is once again hidden.

References 
 Mheibes – A traditional Iraqi game during Ramadan - Prashant Rao

Traditional games
Iraqi culture
Articles containing video clips